Dermot Murphy is an Irish actor, known for Raw (2013), Clean Break (2015) and The Drummer and the Keeper (2017). Murphy portrayed musician Bob Geldof in the biographical drama Bohemian Rhapsody (2018).

Filmography

Film

Television

References

External links
 

Living people
21st-century Irish male actors
Actors from County Wexford
People from Wexford, County Wexford
Year of birth missing (living people)